is a passenger railway station  located in the city of Sanda, Hyōgo Prefecture, Japan. It is operated by the West Japan Railway Company (JR West).

Lines

Station layout
The station consists of two opposed ground-level side platforms connected to the station building by a footbridge. Originally the station has a side platform and an island platform, but the track on one side of the island platform (Platform 2) have been removed. The station is unattended.

Platforms

Adjacent stations

History
Aimoto Sation opened on 25 March 1899, as a station of Hankaku Railway, which was nationalized in 1907. With the privatization of the Japan National Railways (JNR) on 1 April 1987, the station came under the aegis of the West Japan Railway Company.

Station numbering was introduced in March 2018 with Aimoto being assigned station number JR-G65

Passenger statistics
In fiscal 2016, the station was used by an average of 203 passengers daily

Surrounding area
 Japan National Route 176

See also
List of railway stations in Japan

References

External links 

 Aimoto Station from JR-Odekake.net 

Railway stations in Hyōgo Prefecture
Railway stations in Japan opened in 1899
Sanda, Hyōgo